The Estádio Dr. Magalhães Pessoa is a football stadium in Leiria, Portugal, built as a venue for the UEFA Euro 2004 finals held in Portugal. It is the home for Leiria's main football club, União de Leiria. It was designed by Tomás Taveira in 2003. The stadium contains different coloured seats as well as an athletics track and has a capacity of 24 000 (22 000 used). The stadium has also hosted the Supertaça Cândido de Oliveira (the Portuguese Super Cup) in 2006 and 2007 and the final of the league cup Taça da Liga in 2009,2021,2022 and 2023.

Games held
During the UEFA Euro 2004 finals, the stadium hosted Croatia's matches against Switzerland in a 0–0 draw and France in a 2–2 draw in Group B. It also hosted the 2006 Supertaça Cândido de Oliveira where Porto defeated Vitória de Setúbal 3–0 with goals from Anderson, Adriano and Vieirinha. The following year, in 2007, it again played host to the Supertaça, but this time Sporting CP won the title over Porto by a score of 1–0.
In 2021 and 2022, the stadium was host to the finals of the Taça da Liga in which Sporting CP won their third and fourth title in the competition.

Design 
The Estádio Dr. Magalhães Pessoa intends to complement its surrounding territory with a part of the stadium that opens towards the scenery and another part that shows the defence wall of a medieval castle dominating the city. The project, created by architect Tomás Taveira, consists of continuous tiers that run a wavy course. The tiers are highest at the main stands (in the center of the stadium) and gently wind down in correspondence with the south stand behind one of the goals. This leaves an opening towards the city, the woods and the castle that overlooks the stadium.

The roof follows the course of the tiers which are placed according to an elliptical framework that is brusquely interrupted at the north stand. The north stand contained a temporary and uncovered tribune that ran parallel to one of the playing field's short sides. After Euro 2004, however, the tribune was demolished to leave space for a commercial centre and hotel. In addition, an athletics track was built completing the elliptical framework. As a consequence, the stadium's capacity was reduced by 5,000 seats.

The seats are of different colours, placed randomly. The use of different tint colours characterizes the entire stadium. The roof is constructed with a transparent material that has external light filtered which makes the yellow colour of the metallic structure stand out. The roof appears to float on the tiers; it is, however, hanging on steel tie-beams (in blue) and tall pennons (in red) that are only located above the main tribunes. The external perimeter is characterized by squared panels of lively tints placed on a natural white background separated by the red metallic pillars.

The well-balanced use of different colours is also evident throughout the stadium. Five levels consisting of several internal rooms provide numerous services to the audience such as restaurants and commercial activities. The stadium serves as a multi-functional building where sports of every kind can be played, including track and field, and also were music concerts are held often providing a wonderful scenery and a colourful background.

Portugal national team
The following Portugal national football team matches were held in the stadium.

UEFA Euro 2004

References

UEFA Euro 2004 stadiums
Magalhaes Pessoa
U.D. Leiria
Buildings and structures in Leiria
Sport in Leiria
Buildings and structures in Leiria District
Sports venues completed in 2003
Athletics (track and field) venues in Portugal